Kevyn Stafford (born May 29, 1964) is a Canadian sprint canoer who competed in the early 1990s. She finished sixth in the K-4 500 m event at the 1992 Summer Olympics in Barcelona.

References
Sports-Reference.com profile

External links

1964 births
Canadian female canoeists
Canoeists at the 1992 Summer Olympics
Living people
Olympic canoeists of Canada
Place of birth missing (living people)